J. Mark Scearce (born October 9, 1960) is an American composer known for his musical settings of more than 200 texts by forty poets—from art songs to operas to works for chorus and orchestra.

Early life 
J. Mark Scearce was born in Edina, Missouri and grew up in neighboring Kirksville.  There he graduated high school in 1979, and attended Northeast Missouri State University (now Truman State), graduating in 1983.  At NMSU he triple-majored in music theory, horn performance, and philosophy & religion.

During high school and college, Scearce established himself as a jazz trumpeter, winning outstanding soloist awards at regional jazz festivals (St. Charles, Wichita, Springfield).

Despite acceptance at North Texas to pursue this trajectory, Scearce chose to become a contemporary classical composer after his undergraduate studies, attending Indiana University on the strength of his first composition, a brass quintet written for and recorded by the Chicago Brass Quintet.

Scearce received his Masters and Doctorate in Music Composition from Indiana in 1986 and 1993 respectively.

Career and influences 
Scearce’s catalogue of music compositions totals nearly a thousand performances of sixty works, including seven commercial recordings on the Delos, Warner Bros, Capstone, Centaur, Albany, and Equilibrium labels.

Having formally studied with composers John Eaton, Harvey Sollberger, and Donald Erb—all of whom had deep and lasting influences on his music—Scearce only developed his characteristic tonal style with the work Gaea’s Lament, written in 1989 for cellist and ethnomusicologist Jonathan Kramer, whom Scearce met fresh out of graduate school in North Carolina and whose eclectic holistic teaching highly influenced him.

His associations with other performers and performing organizations shaped many of the forty commissions he received for his music since.

Conductor Al Sturgis has conducted two ballets, two operas, two choral/orchestral works, and six choral works.  Conductor John Gordon Ross has conducted thirty-three performances of eight orchestral works.

Endymion’s Sleep, Anima Mundi, and This Thread were borne from Scearce’s association with the Nashville Chamber Orchestra and its Music Director Paul Gambill.

Six works were performed by the North Carolina Symphony (including XL, Urban Primitive, and Antaeus) and twice that by the Carolina Ballet (including The Kreutzer Sonata, Guernica, and Dracula) for a total of 150 performances between these two organizations alone.

Second to vocal music, his music for ballet has made the greatest impact with audiences, brought about through a close working relationship with choreographer Robert Weiss with whom he has created six ballets including the full-evening Macbeth.

He has written four operas including the full-evening Falling Angel which The Wall Street Journal has called "a noirish thriller skillfully distilled from the original—a complicated detective story laced with voodoo, Satanism and murder".

His String Quartet 1° was premiered by the Ciompi Quartet of Duke and recorded by the Fry Street Quartet.  His Str Qt Nr 2 was premiered by the Borromeo Quartet at Bargemusic in Brooklyn for the 125th anniversary of the Brooklyn Bridge.  His Third Quartet was premiered by the Penderecki String Quartet on the Open Ear Festival in Toronto.

In writing about Scearce in CVNC, critic John Lambert observed that “his uncanny ability to create melody, to marry melody to words, and to forge combinations of the two to convey emotions or drama or suspense or awe has long set him apart from many of his peers.” 

On November 19, 2019, Scearce ceased a forty-year career as a composer with four works unproduced:

Teaching positions 
Scearce served as an arts administrator with the Bowling Green (OH) New Music and Art Festival, the Raleigh (NC) Symphony Development Association, and the Indiana University New Music Ensemble.

He was Composer-in-Residence at North Carolina State University for two years in the early 90s before serving three years on the faculty of the University of Hawaii, where he was founder and director of a contemporary music ensemble and new music festival.

Following three years as Composer-in-Residence as part of the national Meet The Composer New Residencies program, Dr. Scearce taught for a year on the visiting music composition faculty of the University of North Texas before accepting a three-year appointment as Resident Composer in the School of Music at the University of Southern Maine.

He was chair of the Music Department at NC State for nine years and is currently a tenured full professor there in the famed College of Design.

Honors and awards 
In 2009 he received the International Raymond and Beverly Sackler Prize in Music Composition, the largest single annual award in the field.

In 2010 he was awarded the Raleigh Medal of Arts for lifetime achievement.

He has had residencies at Ucross, MacDowell, and Yaddo artist colonies, as well as Ernest Block, Atlantic Center, June in Buffalo, and Wellesley Composers Conferences early in his career.

He is a Phi Beta Kappa, Pi Kappa Lambda, Phi Alpha Theta, Mu Beta Psi.

Selected vocal works 
1992 — Estlin (e.e. cummings)
1993 — Field & Stream (Raymond Carver)
1995 — Bird by Bird (A.R. Ammons)
1997 — American Triptych (Jane Kenyon)
2002 — This Thread (Toni Morrison)
2004 — Str Qt Nr 2 (Hart Crane)
2009 — Bright Star (Keats)
2012 — Missa Memoriae (Catullus)
2013 — Symmetries & Asymmetries  (W.H. Auden)
2014 — Falling Angel (Hjorstberg, libretto Lucy Thurber)
2015 — Keeping Things Whole  (Mark Strand)
2017 — FABER  (Frisch, libretto Scearce)
2019 — Orpheus Alone (String Quartet No 4)* (Mark Strand)
*Last Work

References 

1960 births
Living people
American male classical composers
American classical composers
People from Edina, Missouri
People from Kirksville, Missouri
Truman State University alumni
Indiana University Bloomington alumni
20th-century classical composers
21st-century American composers
21st-century classical composers
North Carolina State University faculty
University of Hawaiʻi faculty
University of North Texas faculty
University of Southern Maine faculty
20th-century American composers
Classical musicians from Missouri
20th-century American male musicians
21st-century American male musicians